The 1993 Penn State Nittany Lions football team represented the Pennsylvania State University in the 1993 NCAA Division I-A football season. The team was coached by Joe Paterno and played its home games in Beaver Stadium in University Park, Pennsylvania. This was Penn State's first season as a member of the Big Ten Conference.

Schedule
Penn State did not play Big Ten teams Purdue and Wisconsin this year.

Roster

Season summary

Ohio State

NFL Draft
Four Nittany Lions were drafted in the 1994 NFL Draft.

References

Penn State
Penn State Nittany Lions football seasons
Citrus Bowl champion seasons
Penn State Nittany Lions football